The 1915–16 PCHA season was the fifth season of the professional men's ice hockey Pacific Coast Hockey Association league. Season play ran from December 7, 1915, until February 25, 1916. Each team would play 18 games. The Portland Rosebuds club would be PCHA champions. After the season the club would play the Stanley Cup finals series against the Montreal Canadiens, NHA champions. Montreal would win the best-of-five series 3–2 to win the Cup.

League business
The league granted a new franchise to Seattle, the Metropolitans. To stock the team, the team signed Harry Holmes, Frank Foyston, Jack Walker, Cully Wilson of the Toronto NHA team. This caused retaliatory raids and Bert Lindsay, Frank Nighbor, Skinner Poulin and Walter Smaill all were signed to NHA clubs.

Regular season

Final standings
Note: W = Wins, L = Losses, T = Ties, GF= Goals For, GA = Goals against

Playoffs
The Rosebuds won the championship and travelled east to meet the Montreal Canadiens for the Stanley Cup. The Canadiens won the series 3-2 to claim the Cup. As champions of the PCHA, the Rosebuds engraved their team name on the Cup.

Stanley Cup Final

Results

 † Cancelled due to fog.
 ‡ Replay of game on February 15.
 a at Seattle.

Source: Coleman 1966.

Player statistics

Goaltending averages

Scoring leaders

See also
1915 in sports
1916 in sports
1915–16 NHA season
List of pre-NHL seasons

References

Notes

Bibliography

 
Pacific Coast Hockey Association seasons
PCHA
PCHA